The Antelope Fire was a wildfire that burned in the Klamath National Forest, the Modoc National Forest, the Shasta-Trinity National Forest, and in Lava Beds National Monument in Siskiyou County, California, in the United States. The fire was started by a lightning strike and was first reported on August 1, 2021. As of October 15th, the fire had burned .

Events

August

The Antelope Fire was first reported in the drainage of Antelope Creek in the Goosenest Ranger District of the Klamath National Forest in Siskiyou County, California on August 1, 2021, around 10:30 AM. The fire was one of many started by lightning strikes in the area during a thunderstorm. The fire was fueled by ponderosa pine and mixed conifer. On August 3, the communities of Bray, Tennant, and Antelope Creek were evacuated due to the fire. On August 4, a temporary flight restriction was put in place for the fire area. The fire burned around the town of Tennant and threatened the community of Antelope Creek. Additional evacuation orders were put in place for Mount Hebron and areas of Round Valley later in the day. On August 5, Governor Gavin Newsom declared a state of emergency due to the Antelope Fire.

Overnight from August 5 to the morning of the 6th, the fire exhibited extreme fire behavior, including flame lengths over 100 feet. The fire pushed east toward Garner Mountain as fire crews worked to further protect Tennant, Bray and Shasta Wood. By August 7, the fire was 20 percent contained and had started burning in Shasta-Trinity National Forest. Evacuation orders were extended to Shasta Wood and Duck Lake and the communities of Medicine Lake, Payne Springs, and Blanche Lake were place under evacuation warnings. The Forest Service also closed the forest area in and around the fire. An evacuation warning for Red Rock Road was put in place and the evacuation center in Dorris was moved to Yreka, California. A 20-30 acre spot fire crossed the control line on the eastern perimeter near Garner Mountain, which was contained as soon as possible by firefighters. As of August 25, the fire had burned  and was 37 percent contained.

September

Fire activity remained minimal until September 8, when extreme fire behavior occurred under a red flag warning. Over the next week, the fire pushed into the Lava Beds National Monument and behind Sheepy Ridge, effectively doubling in size. After the red flag warning was lifted, the fire showed no significant fire  growth.

October

The rugged terrain in the fire zone made containment a slow process. Crews focused on using handlines, dozer lines, and defensive burning to minimize fire spread, protect timber resources, and minimize the fire's impact on the landscape. On October 15, the Antelope Fire was 100% contained.

Closures

Portions of Klamath National Forest were closed through November 25th, 2021, due to the fire.

Impact

Environment

Air quality was impacted in the region surrounding the fire. Ash was reported as "blanketing cars" and smoke "choking the air" in the Klamath Basin. In early August, smoke and ash from the fire reached the Bootleg Fire in Oregon, which helped to curb the Bootleg's growth.

Recreation and tourism
Like many fires burning during the 2021 California wildfire season, the Antelope Fire deeply impacted recreational and tourism activities in the area. On August 7, the forest service closed Klamath National Forest due to the Antelope and nearby Tennant Fire. The closure was lifted on November 25th, 2021.

Gallery

References

External links

"Rock slide on 299 blocks main road for fighting the Monument Fire" from KRCR

2021 California wildfires
Klamath National Forest
Siskiyou County, California
Shasta-Trinity National Forest
Wildfires in Siskiyou County, California